Artyom Dorofeyev (born June 20, 1992) is a Russian professional ice hockey player. He is currently playing with Arlan Kokshetau of the Kazakhstan Hockey Championship (KHC).

Dorofeyev made his Kontinental Hockey League (KHL) debut playing with Atlant Moscow Oblast during the 2012–13 KHL season.

References

External links

1992 births
Living people
Arlan Kokshetau players
Atlant Moscow Oblast players
Nikkō Ice Bucks players
Russian ice hockey defencemen